Fletch Lives is a 1989 American comedy mystery film starring Chevy Chase and the sequel to Fletch (1985), directed by Michael Ritchie from a screenplay by Leon Capetanos based on the character created by Gregory Mcdonald.

Plot
Fletch, a reporter in Los Angeles for the Los Angeles Times, is contacted by the executor of his late aunt's will, attorney Amanda Ray Ross. Ross informs Fletch he has inherited his aunt's  plantation, Belle Isle, in Thibodaux, Louisiana. Upon arriving, Fletch is disappointed to find the mansion terribly dilapidated, but he agrees to keep on its caretaker, Calculus Entropy. Fletch has dinner with Ross at her home, and she tells him of an anonymous $225,000 bid for Belle Isle.

Fletch awakens the next morning to find Ross dead. Fletch is charged with Ross's murder and taken into custody, nearly being raped by his cellmate Ben Dover, spared only because Dover is released on bail. Dover's lawyer Hamilton "Ham" Johnson manages to get Fletch released. When Fletch declines a second, even larger, offer of $250,000 for Belle Isle, this time presented by realtor Becky Culpepper, he starts getting harassed. First, a hired group of Ku Klux Klansmen harasses him. Then, an arsonist burns down the mansion. Finally, Ben Dover tries to kill Fletch during a raccoon hunt with some locals. Fletch discovers the land on Belle Isle is polluted by toxic waste. He determines to uncover the identity of the anonymous buyer, whom he suspects is attempting to intimidate him into selling.

He learns the local megachurch, Farnsworth Ministries, is interested in obtaining the Belle Isle property. Fletch investigates televangelist Jimmy Lee Farnsworth, and discovers Farnsworth's daughter is Becky Culpepper. The toxic chemicals in the soil of Belle Isle are traced back to Bly Bio, a chemical waste facility in Mississippi. Fletch obtains an invoice from the plant's manager, which proves that Ham Johnson ordered the waste dumped on the Belle Isle land.

Fletch confronts Ham with the evidence at a costume party fundraiser hosted by Ham at his home. Ham admits he polluted Belle Isle out of revenge for the way he feels Farnsworth took advantage of Ham's mother shortly before she died. Farnsworth persuaded her in her confused mental state to give away her valuable land, on which the church then built a profitable amusement park. Ham intended to devalue the land owned by Farnsworth Ministries. He killed Ross when she realized his plan. Becky is captured by Dover and brought to Ham's mansion, and Ham orders Dover to kill Fletch and her. Fletch creates a distraction by spilling out the urn containing Ham's mother's ashes, and Becky and he escape. They flee to the Farnsworth Ministries church nearby, interrupting a televised service in progress. Ham follows them, intending to kill Fletch, but Ham is shot by Calculus. Afterwards, Calculus reveals himself to be FBI Special Agent Goldstein working undercover as part of an investigation of Farnsworth Ministries' financial dealings.

Returning to Los Angeles with Becky, Fletch is thrown a welcome home party by his co-workers and receives a $100,000 insurance claim check for the mansion fire. His ex-wife's alimony lawyer, Marvin Gillett, appears, offering to forego all future alimony payments in exchange for the Belle Isle property. Fletch happily signs over the polluted land.

Cast
 Chevy Chase as Irwin "Fletch" Fletcher
 Hal Holbrook as Hamilton "Ham" Johnson
 Julianne Phillips as Becky Culpepper
 R. Lee Ermey as Jimmy Lee Farnsworth
 Richard Libertini as Frank Walker
 Randall "Tex" Cobb as Ben Dover
 Don Brockett as Sheriff
 Cleavon Little as Calculus Entropy
 George Wyner as Marvin Gillet
 Patricia Kalember as Amanda Ray Ross
 Geoffrey Lewis as Ku Klux Klan Leader
 Richard Belzer as Phil
 Phil Hartman as Bly Bio manager
 Titos Vandis as Uncle Kakakis

Reception
On review aggregator Rotten Tomatoes, 37% of 30 critics' reviews are positive, with an average rating of 4.6/10. The website's critics consensus reads: "Chevy Chase remains ideally suited for the role, but Fletch Lives lacks its predecessor's wit, relying instead on silly disguises, cheap stereotypes, and largely unfunny gags." Metacritic, which uses a weighted average, assigned the film a score of 40 out of 100, based on 19 critics, indicating "mixed or average reviews". Audiences polled by CinemaScore gave the film an average grade of "B" on an A+ to F scale.

Roger Ebert gave it 1.5 out of 4 stars.
The Los Angeles Times wrote: "Some of the lines are funny, but after a while you just want to smack him."

Box office

The movie debuted at No. 1. It went on to gross $39.4 million worldwide.

References

External links

 
 
 

1980s crime comedy films
1989 films
American crime comedy films
American films with live action and animation
American sequel films
Comedy mystery films
Films about journalists
Films set in Los Angeles
Films set in Louisiana
Films directed by Michael Ritchie
Films scored by Harold Faltermeyer
Universal Pictures films
Films about the Ku Klux Klan
1989 comedy films
1980s English-language films
1980s American films